Vacarciuc is a surname. Notable people with the surname include:

Andrei Vacarciuc (born 1952), Moldovan politician
Vadim Vacarciuc (born 1972), Moldovan weightlifter